Ninetis is a genus of cellar spiders that was first described by Eugène Louis Simon in 1890.

Species
 it contains six species, found only in Africa and Yemen:
Ninetis faro Huber, 2014 – Cameroon
Ninetis minuta (Berland, 1920) – Somalia, Kenya, Tanzania
Ninetis namibiae Huber, 2000 – Namibia
Ninetis russellsmithi Huber, 2002 – Malawi
Ninetis subtilissima Simon, 1890 (type) – Yemen
Ninetis toliara Huber & El-Hennawy, 2007 – Madagascar

See also
 List of Pholcidae species

References

Araneomorphae genera
Pholcidae
Spiders of Africa